WKVZ (102.1 FM) is a radio station broadcasting a Contemporary Christian format. Licensed to Dexter, Maine, United States, the station serves the Bangor area. The station is owned by the Educational Media Foundation and features programming from the K-LOVE Network.

Programming and history 
Before becoming WKVZ in 2009, the 102.1 FM frequency in Dexter was an oldies station using the call letters WGUY-FM, which went on the air in 1993. In December 2001, the station changed to a satellite smooth jazz format, then reverted to the oldies format in March 2003. In September 2008, it began simulcasting on co-owned WFZX before being sold to Educational Media Foundation and changing formats in February 2009 to K-LOVE's christian music format. The station  carried University of Maine men's and women's basketball for the 2007 season before moving to WAEI.

References

External links

Contemporary Christian radio stations in the United States
K-Love radio stations
Radio stations established in 1993
Mass media in Penobscot County, Maine
1993 establishments in Maine
Educational Media Foundation radio stations
KVZ